The Pioneer Conference is an IHSAA-sanctioned athletic conference formed in 2009. It is made up of ten small private, military, laboratory, and/or charter schools from Delaware, Hamilton, Johnson, Madison, Marion, and Wayne counties. All schools are Class 1A IHSAA members.

Members

Former Members

History
The conference was formed in 2009, with four Indianapolis-area private schools (Baptist, Greenwood Christian, International, Liberty Christian) joining with recently reopened IPS school Attucks, whose medical focus causes the school to be smaller than its public counterparts. The 2010–11 school year also brought another small IPS school into the fold, Shortridge. The Conference expanded outside of the immediate Indianapolis area in 2015, adding three Independent schools (Anderson Prep, Seton Catholic, and University), as well as Muncie Burris, who had been voted out of the Mid-Eastern Conference the year before. Indianapolis Attucks left in 2018, and was replaced by Bethesda Christian. Park Tudor would also join the conference in 2019.

Membership timeline

Conference Championships

Boys Basketball

Girls Basketball

Baseball

Boys' Tennis

All-Conference Teams

Baseball 
2016

References

External links
Conference Membership
IHSAA

Education in Indianapolis
Indiana high school athletic conferences
Marion County, Indiana
Sports competitions in Indianapolis